The News-Times is a semiweekly newspaper published in Newport, Oregon, United States. It was established in the 1880s and is owned by the News Media Corporation. The News-Times is published on Wednesdays and Fridays has a circulation of 6,061. It is the newspaper of record for Lincoln County.

History

At least 20 different newspapers have been published in the Lincoln County area. The county's first newspaper was the Yaquina Post, established in 1882 and published in Yaquina City by Collins Van Cleve. In 1889, Van Cleve was also publishing the Scio Press out of Yaquina City. One of the papers, founded in 1886, was called the Newport News, but it was short-lived.

Various newspapers started and closed until 1893, when, in the same year Lincoln County was officially established from part of Benton County, two newspapers were started: the Yaquina Bay News out of Newport, and the Lincoln County Leader out of Toledo. The Yaquina Bay News became known as the Newport News by the 1960s, after many ownership and name changes and mergers. At this time the Newport News bought out the Lincoln County Times of Waldport, the two names were combined to form the News-Times. The News-Times bought the Lincoln County Leader about a year later. The paper is currently owned by News Media Corporation, who purchased it from Lee Enterprises in 2007.

References

External links

 Oregon Newspaper Publishers Association page

1882 establishments in Oregon
Newport, Oregon
Newspapers published in Oregon
Oregon Newspaper Publishers Association
Publications established in 1882